"Remedy" is a song by British rapper Professor Green, taken from his second studio album, At Your Inconvenience. The track features vocals from Irish singer-songwriter Ruth-Anne Cunningham. The track serves as the album's third official single, and was released as a digital download in the United Kingdom on 14 May 2012. For its single release, the track has been heavily remixed by TMS, completely changing the backing instrumental, for a heavier, club sound.

Music video
A music video to accompany the release of "Taco on the floor" premiered on YouTube on 27 April 2012. The video lasts a total length of 3 minutes and 17 seconds, and shows Green and his friends on a night out in East London. BBC Breakfast host Bill Turnbull appears in a cameo near the end of the video. Professor Green's girlfriend is played by current UFC ring girl Carly Baker, whilst his real-life girlfriend Millie Mackintosh from Made in Chelsea as also appears in the video. Page Three Idol 2011 winner Lucy Collett, Rizzle Kicks, Dream McLean and Rinse also appear in the video. Also appearing on numerous occasions is Charlotte from the E4 reality series Dirty Sexy Things.

Live performances
Green promoted the release of the single with a live performance on The Voice of Ireland on 22 April 2012.

On 5 May 2012 "Remedy" was filmed live at Brixton Academy using Mativision cameras, this technology enables viewers to be able to view the performance from 6 different angles and in 360 degrees.

Track listing

Chart performance

Release history

References

2012 singles
Virgin Records singles
Professor Green songs
Songs written by RuthAnne
Song recordings produced by Mojam
Songs written by Mustafa Omer
Songs written by Professor Green
2011 songs